The White Vault is a found footage horror fiction podcast created by K.A. Statz. It features an international cast and crew, with notable members including David Ault and Peter Lewis of The NoSleep Podcast, as well as Lani Minella and Eric Nelsen.

Cast and characters

Main

Seasons 1 and 2 

 Lani Minella as Dr. Rosa De La Torre
 David Ault as Walter Heath
 Peter Joseph Lewis as Graham Casner
 Eyþór Viðarsson as Jónas Þórirsson
 Kessi Riliniki as Dr. Karina Schumacher-Weiß
 Hem Cleveland as The Documentarian

Season 3 

 Diane Casanova as Eva Olivia Moreno
 Carla García as Dr. Josefa Guerrero
 Eric Nelsen as Simon Hall
 Danilo Battistini as Lucas Criado
 Sophie Yang as Dr. Zhou Liu
 Alli Smalley as Dr. Carito Ureta

Season 4 

 Tanja Milojevic as Dragana Vuković
 L. Jeffrey Moore as Raimy Armstead
 Haytham Alwan as Maheer Issa
 Karin Heimdahl as Mor

Season 5 

 Beth Eyre as Dr. Amelia Murray
 Ewan Chung as Dr. Carter Duàn
 Charlotte Norup as Nadine Teuling
 Lauren Choo as Lisa Mǎ
 Stephanie Izsak as Kelly
 Albin Weidenbladh as Vidar Henriksson

The White Vault: Artifact
Tanja Milojevic as Marion Sutton
Heather Mclellan as Luca
Matthew McLean as Davis
Rob Harrison as Alex

The White Vault: Imperial
Sophie Yang as Dr. Zhou Liu
Andrea Galata as Brother Benedetto
Jd'almeida Pinheiro as Father Martim
Ewan Chun as Jingwei

The White Vault: Iluka
Beth Eyre as Dr. Amelia Murray
Dagur Jóhannesson as Mr. Árni Einarson
Daniel Muñoz as Dr. Oscar Flores
Dallas Wheatley as Charlie Lord
Angus Brennan as Franco Reed
Sam Yeow as Alex Lái
Daniel Bunton as Captain Stephen Reimann

The White Vault: Avrum
Yelena Shmulenson as Avrum ben Judah
Lika Khukhashvili as Rivka

Plot

Seasons 1 and 2
A repair team is sent to discover the source behind a mysterious signal coming from a remote Arctic research station in Svalbard, Norway, documentation of which - including audio recordings, video recordings, unsent emails and written notes - are presented by the Documentarian, who narrates the series, in roughly chronological order to the listener.

Following the arrival of the team at the station, Outpost Fristed, and the suspiciously easy repair of the station's malfunctioning equipment, the team is trapped by a heavy blizzard that fails to subside. The team's situation begins to unravel, following the discovery of a service hatch in the storage bunker, which leads to an ancient village trapped underneath a glacier.

Following the discovery of the village, the team is subjected to a number of mysterious horrors. A strange chant, coupled with what sounds like a man screaming, is the only response to calls for assistance and rescue on the radio; upon a visit to the village, Karina falls from a ledge, and later wakes up, dissimilar to her previous self and adamant that she jumped from something "tall, black and skinny" that was reaching for her; the Outpost's generator is sabotaged, and deep, five-fingered scratches appear on the exterior of the bunker; a stone box, forming the floor of part of an anatomical theatre within the village, is brought back by Heath and discovered to contain a human heart and a full set of teeth. Statues within the village also begin to appear and disappear without warning or sign of movement upon later visits. Karina begins to see doppelgangers of the team members within the bunker. After discovering the sabotage of the generator, Karina begins chanting in German, and becomes more paranoid and frightened.

Following the abduction and death of Karina and the sabotage of the Outpost's food supplies and snow mobiles, the team is forced to come up with an escape plan, which ends in the abduction of Heath and the team being trapped in the ancient village. The team attempt to escape through the cave systems beneath it, resulting in the abduction of Casner; after the discovery of a small room covered with glowing glyphs, Rosa is also abducted. Jónas, having been hurt by one of the statues previously, is the sole survivor, and leaves a final written note to his family, as his injury transforms him into the same creature Karina attempted to escape from.

Season 3
An archaeological team is assembled to examine a recently discovered archaeological site in the Patagonian Andes, on the mountain of Cerro Torre. The team, consisting of two doctoral candidates from the University of Pittsburgh and the Universidad Nacional de La Plata and their two professors, is joined by Dr. Zhou Liu, who has studied records of glyphs found in Heilongjiang province, China, similar to the petroglyphs recently discovered at the Patagonian site. The team is taken up the mountain by tour guide Lucas Criado, who is employed by Sina-Beni Retreats.

The team arrives at base camp following a helicopter ride. Following a day of work along the petroglyphs on the mountain's cliff face, Eva discovers an alcove, which is then identified as the entrance to a cave by the rest of the team. Switching focus, the team investigates the cave, discovering moving statues, an anatomical theatre with a floor made of small stone boxes, glyphs, and evidence of early human occupation.

While the rest of the team's excitement grows, Dr. Liu begins to worry, and Dr. Ureta becomes withdrawn from the rest of the group. Various members of the camp begin to see doppelgangers along the path, in the tent or in the cave. Following the discovery of stone statues and a double door within the cave, Dr. Liu demands that Lucas take the team down the mountain, but is denied. A swarm of insects that exits the doors when opened stings Eva. In her notes, Dr. Liu details that aspects of the site - the statues, the cave, the door - align exactly with those detailed in Chinese records, and that she fears the team is in danger.

As investigation of the archaeological site continues, heavy, dense fog surrounds the mountain, and the satellite phone needed to call for the helicopter in order for the team to leave goes missing. Lucas begins acting strangely around the site, scratching at the glyphs and chanting in Portuguese. Heavy snowfall surrounds the site, and the statues within the cave begin to go missing, before reappearing without notice. Overnight recordings from the cave show Dr. Ureta talking clearly to an unknown person, whom she appears to believe is conversing with her, but whose half of the conversation is completely inaudible and non-existent. The recording shows her descending the mountain path again, but the following morning, Dr. Ureta is nowhere to be found.

Lucas injures Simon's ankle severely by pushing him into an insect nest concealing broken bones, before running off out of the cave. In her notes, Eva details that she has spoken with Dr. Liu, and that she cannot stop thinking about what she said and the pictures, implied of the Chinese site, in her papers. Eva's injury from the insect bite continues to worsen, with snowfall around the site constant and temperatures rapidly dropping.

As the fog continues to surround the site, the situation declines, with the team forced to consider ways of getting off the mountain with an injured person and no chance of rescue; all attempts at radioing for help result in either static or unidentifiable chanting over the sound of a person screaming. Dr. Liu tells the team all that she knows about the site in China, and that they are unlikely to be able to leave; despite this, they continue to plan for their descent. As Eva descends the mountain one last time to gather supplies from base camp, a colossal tremor of snow and rockfall cuts her off from the rest of the team, and she is later found further down the mountain, severely injured and barely conscious.

Season 4
A rescue group is assembled and sent to find the stranded Patagonian archaeological team. The Documentarian is reunited with her mysterious estranged mother.

Season 5
Chaos erupts after the destruction of the Patagonia site, as the remaining team members – Graham Casner, Dragana Vuković and Dr Josefa Guerrero – attempt to return to Svalbard, and the Documentarian presses to learn the true nature of her family's connections to the events. No one knows much about the creatures, not where they come from, not why they live as they do. They demand human sacrifice, or they threaten death of the planet by natural disaster and climate destruction if not appeased. Several dozen families scattered all over the world had special powers to come together and fight the creatures to send them underground, but they were never really gone. The families fell out, divided, and scattered across the globe for all their own purposes. The Documentarian's mother, who takes her to a hideout deep in isolation in the Swedish mountains to their own site where their own creatures are found, says their family is to never break the cycle or threaten the ritual, and after the Documentarian's half-sister died, she is to be the heir to the legacy.

On the flight to Longyearbyen, Graham has a nightmare about his previous time in Svalbard, and admits to Josefa that he still sees his previous team members while awake; Josefa states that she also sees deceased members of the Patagonia team, though she cannot distinguish whether this happens in dreams or while she is awake. Josefa theorizes, based on her collected notes, that the sites across the world act as a net to hold something back or keep it contained, and that the destruction of one site has led to an escalation.

Upon arriving in Longyearbyen, the team discover that an intense and fast-approaching storm has grounded all flights to Svalbard, with many passengers stranded in the airport and on Svalbard itself. All communications to Svalbard have broken down, and the last time communications were possible was days ago, with the last known communication being a strange, interrupted radio transmission to CAZSO, the Canadian Arctic Zone Science Organization. The team's helicopter flight does not arrive, but the radio operator at CAZSO tells them that if Dragana is willing to pilot a flight, there may be a helicopter available, and that flight and landing are still possible.

The team are introduced to Dr Amelia Murray, an oceanographer hired by Sidja Grúp, who has a helicopter but no pilot, and needs to get to Svalbard to deliver medical supplies and collect samples. Josefa leads Dr Murray off to look at the shoreline, and Dr Murray admits that she can see the statues under the waves. Casner briefly needs to step away to a cliff near the shore, before he shortly returns to start the trip with the rest of the group. As the team fly by instrument readings into Svalbard, the weather in front of them clears, while the weather behind and above them worsens. Casner indicates that they need to get to the snowmobiles. Traversing the empty streets of Svalbard, the team discover fresh blood, a murdered man's corpse, and that one of the guardians has torn through every wooden building like paper.

The team take shelter in one of the buildings, and are attacked by a dozen survivors chanting the verse in different languages. They escape, and manage to make it to the medical supplies building, where they ascertain that other survivors have picked over the supplies; theorizing, they decide to head to the weather station, an elevated metal building and the most likely place of shelter. There they meet a number of survivors, but Dr Murray is injured by one of them when they react to being found and can no longer accompany Dragana, Josefa, and Casner. Murray is being watched by one of the creatures through the window, so she leaves with her bags and the shotgun to follow the lure. She meets one creature who used to be Jónas Þórirsson, being told to leave everything behind and follow him for more answers. Murray is never seen again, and none of her remains turn up later.

Over the course of the season, Casner is ultimately led to the Svalbard vault site under false pretenses by the Documentarian, at the instruction of her mother, to initiate her into the family's responsibilities. The Documentarian is devastated, but she reluctantly joins the operations. Josefa becomes more unhinged, eventually calling upon the creatures to help her understand, which leads to one snatching and killing her. Casner and Dragana rush down into the caves, but they're too late to save Josefa, and one of the creatures, in the form of Rosa De La Torre, says Casner needs to come with them. Dragana, horrified and furious, protests and starts firing their shotgun. The creature gouges Dragana's torso and throws her back, and Casner is dragged away into the depths and sacrificed, ending the current cycle and closing the caverns.

Dragana, distraught, leaves the cave, and all the remaining survivors, lucid and insane are rescued and reunited with their loved ones. The storms and natural disasters dissipate, with the mental breakdowns of the people in the village being attributed to no more than "mass hysteria". The Documentarian moves from Britain to Sweden to be with her mother, where Dragana confronts her at her office and hits her for all the damage she's caused. The Documentarian apologizes best she can, then gives her a video from Casner, which Dragana accepts. Casner passes on a message to his daughter that he loves her and she should grow up however she wants, which brings Dragana to tears, as that was why he was on the cliffside. The Documentarian's mother and Hulda, the widow of Jónas, meet over desert, where the bone artifact in Murray's possession is shown to have cracked when it was passed to her to get her killed. Hulda blames the Documentarian's mother, but she smashes a glass and says she'll severely punish her for any harm Hulda causes her family. Mother and daughter reunite, and after sharing a meal in the daughter's new apartment, the Documentarian makes a video to her own future child, reciting all the same files she narrated throughout the podcast in hopes they can find a solution to stop the things buried beneath the world.

Ramy and Simon are getting married, and they receive a package with a carving akin to the sites. They return it to sender to avoid more danger, but Ramy ends up accepting a job at Agneta's and Linnea's family company.

Spin-offs

The White Vault: Artifact
Marion Sutton, doctoral student at the University of Oxford, is assigned to begin research on a mysterious artifact gifted to the university by an anonymous donor. As her time with the object progresses, she begins to experience strange events and hear whispers. As her and her associates attempt to date, photograph, and research the object, the artifact seems to change expression, growing more angry as the study continues. Nightmares begin to cripple Marion. Luca, an artist tasked with drawing the artifact, is found dead by her own hand after an extended period with the artifact. Marion is believed to have walked into the ocean, driven mad by the object and how it calls to her.

The White Vault: Imperial
In the early 1700s, a Jesuit cartographic team reaches the lands of China, and sets about plans to complete a map of Qing dynasty China.

The White Vault: Iluka
Dr Amelia Murray sits down with a representative of Sidja Grúp to review recordings and documents of the events that took place on board the shifting oceanic research vessel Iluka.

The Iluka, working in the Southern Ocean to collect deep-sea sediment cores and water samples using a vibrocorer, unexpectedly pulls up a large stone statue from the sea floor, tangled up in the equipment. The team work to remove the statue from the vibrocorer's legs, noting that it resembles a crab, or some kind of crustacean, and inform the captain they will have to remain stationary until the statue is untangled.

As they attempt to repair the vibrocorer, strange events begin to take place on board the Iluka: a dead whale floats to the surface of the sea, and nothing comes to scavenge from it; the statue moves around the ship's deck, disappearing and reappearing, while the deck cameras malfunction; the statue is unaffected by use of a scratch kit, and is deemed unidentifiable in material composition.

Two of the crew, Dr Oscar Flores and Franco Reid, are cut by the statue after touching it, with Franco falling seriously ill in a short space of time. In personal recordings, Franco complains that he is unable to eat anything, feels like his skin is crawling, and cannot get warm. The next day, Franco, working in the laboratory, is found running boiling water over his skin and scratching it, resulting in his skin debriding and revealing dark, shiny flesh underneath. A curtailed medical report details that in the walk to the freezer, a number of Franco's teeth fell out; Dr Murray details that "everything that was Franco was falling away", and that the medical officer had no explanation for Franco's condition. In a recording of Franco taken from outside the freezer, the audible breaking of his bones can be heard as he moans in pain.

As Franco's condition continues to deteriorate, Dr Murray returns to the deck to discover that released deep-sea gasses are causing the sea to bubble, and that a number of petrels are falling out of the sky, dead. The crew talk to the captain, who decides to head back to port due to Franco's death.

Upon returning to the kitchen, the crew discover that Franco has escaped. Dr Flores, whose own injury from the statue is developing in the same way as Franco's condition did, tells Dr Murray that he has decided to go out on his own terms, and jumps overboard to avoid the same fate. The crew discover the captain is dead, and that the creature who used to be Franco was the likely culprit; the corpse of the ship's medical officer is also found.

Planning their escape, the crew pile into lifeboats, with the crane technician Alex staying behind to ensure everyone gets off the ship. Dr Murray hears Alex being killed by the creature, and is unable to convince the crew to turn around and go back for her. Follow-up documents note that the crew was rescued by a number of ships that were in the area at the time. The Iluka was recaptured, refueled and towed back to port, with blood on the ship identified as that of the known dead.

The representative of Sidja Grúp informs Dr Murray that he has no questions about her actions on board the Iluka, and formally invites her to take the position of head geological oceanographer at Sidja Grúp. Dr Murray questions why none of the reviewed recordings and documents raised any concerns about her actions, and ascertains that none of the events that took place - the deaths, the statues, what happened to Franco - are new to Sidja's representative. Dr Murray turns down the position and moves to leave; however, Sidja Grúp's representative offers to provide her with information, means and staff familiar with events similar to those of the Iluka, leading Dr Murray to take the job, at Sidja Grúp's more Northern offices.

The White Vault: Avrum
Amid the terror of the 1648 Cossack Uprising, and following the destruction of his home, Avrum is rescued by a group of travelers, befriending a young girl, Rivka.

Bonus episodes
 The White Vault: Summit - A young couple living in Rio de Janeiro get a call from work, informing them that they have won an all expenses paid hiking trip to Patagonia. However, their trip soon unravels, as the pair have no idea what awaits them in the heights of the mountains.
 The White Vault: Acquisition - Stashed away in the streets of Paris, an illegal artifact auction house auctions off unique pieces to the highest bidder; in particular, a journal is up for grabs.

Critical reception
The show has been praised for its diverse cast, immersive soundscape, and use of different languages. The podcast has been featured on the front pages of iTunes, Pandora Radio, Spotify, and Himalaya, on the top 10 charts for The Arts and Performing Arts on iTunes, on the top 50 chart for 'All of iTunes' in the US, and on numerous blogs for 'Best Podcasts/Audio Dramas of 2017'.

Awards and honors

Production 
The budget for the show comes entirely from its fans via crowdfunding through Patreon, and its creators regularly host educational panels across the US on creating radio drama podcasts, including: MAGFest 2020, NY Comciccon 2019, The Austin Film Festival 2019, PodX 2019 (Nashville), Podcon 2019 (Seattle), Podfest 2018-2020 (Orlando), Emerald City Comic Con (2020) Tampa Bay Comic Con (2016-2018), Rose City Comic Con (2017-2019), WW: Philadelphia (2017), and WW: St Louis (2017). They also release exclusive content and episodes through their Patreon such as the spinoff stories Artifact, Imperial, Iluka, Avrum, and The White Vault: A Musical.

Live performances
In December 2017, The White Vault announced that they would perform a live version of their show in New York City as a part of The NoSleep Podcast's 2018 Sleepless Tour. They performed a prequel episode, 'Ashore', at the Highline Ballroom, flying cast members in from Iceland, Germany, and the UK for the event, which was sold out a month before the event. A second live show also took place on October 19 in Cambridge, MA, which also sold out.

References

External links
Official website

2017 podcast debuts
Audio podcasts
Horror podcasts
Horror short stories
American radio dramas
Scripted podcasts